Jean E. Schwarzbauer is an American molecular biologist currently the Eugene Higgins Professor of Molecular Biology at Princeton University. A cited expert in her field, Schwarzbauer's interests are kidney fibrosis, tissue regeneration and repair, cartilage development and tumor formations.

Education
She earned her Ph.D. in Molecular Biology from University of Wisconsin at Madison and her B.S. in chemistry from University of Wisconsin-Milwaukee.

Selected publications
 Miller CG, Budoff G, Prenner JL, Schwarzbauer JE. Minireview: Fibronectin in retinal disease. Exp Biol Med (Maywood). 2017 ;242(1):1-7
 Goyal R, Vega ME, Pastino AK, Singh S, Guvendiren M, Kohn J, et al. A periplasmic polymer curves vibrio. J Biomed Mater Res A. 2017 ;105(8):2162-2170.
 Vega ME, Schwarzbauer JE. Collaboration of fibronectin matrix with other extracellular signals in morphogenesis and differentiation. Curr Opin Cell Biol. 2016 ;42:1-6. 
 Pastino AK, Greco TM, Mathias RA, Cristea IM, Schwarzbauer JE. Stimulatory effects of advanced glycation endproducts (AGEs) on fibronectin matrix assembly. Matrix Biol. 2016
 Schwarzbauer JE, W Leader M, Drubin DG. Setting the bar for cell biology best practices. Mol Biol Cell. 2016 ;27(18):2803
 Harris GM, Madigan NN, Lancaster KZ, Enquist LW, Windebank AJ, Schwartz J, et al. Nerve Guidance by a Decellularized Fibroblast Extracellular Matrix. Matrix Biol. 2016

References

Year of birth missing (living people)
Living people
American molecular biologists
Princeton University faculty
University of Wisconsin–Madison alumni
University of Wisconsin–Milwaukee alumni